The sixth competition weekend of the 2014–15 ISU Speed Skating World Cup was held in the Thialf arena in Heerenveen, Netherlands, from Saturday, 7 February, until Sunday, 8 February 2015.

Schedule
The detailed schedule of events:

All times are CET (UTC+1).

Medal summary

Men's events

Women's events

References

 
6
Isu World Cup, 2014-15, 6
ISU Speed Skating World Cup, 2014-15, World Cup 6